Cory Michael Smith (born November 14, 1986) is an American actor, known for his role as Edward Nygma / The Riddler in the Fox television drama series Gotham. He appeared in Camp X-Ray in 2014. He appeared in 2013 in Breakfast at Tiffany's on Broadway, which starred Emilia Clarke.

Early life
Smith grew up in Columbus, Ohio, and graduated from Hilliard Darby High School in 2005. He had aspirations ranging from becoming a concert pianist to a lawyer. While at Otterbein University, he was cast in such plays as The Scene, The Caucasian Chalk Circle, Who's Afraid of Virginia Woolf?, and Tartuffe. He majored in art musical theater and minored in jazz piano, although he considered dropping out of art musical theater for philosophy or pre-law.

Career
In 2011, Smith was seen in the New York City premiere of The Shaggs: Philosophy of the World at Playwrights Horizons and in 2009 to early 2012 could be seen in various regional theatre productions for the likes of New York Stage and Film. He starred in The Fantasticks at both Barrington Stage Company and The Repertory Theatre of St. Louis. He was also seen in Edith Can Shoot Things and Hit Them.

Smith made his Broadway debut in Breakfast at Tiffany's in 2013. In the same theatre season, he also starred Off-Broadway in both the U.S. premiere of Cock a.k.a. The Cockfight Play by Mike Bartlett and The Whale by Samuel D. Hunter, which had its world premiere at Denver Center for the Performing Arts with the New York premiere at Playwrights Horizons. His first feature film was Camp X-Ray, which premiered at the 2014 Sundance Film Festival in January. He appeared in a short horror movie, Dog Food, co-starring Amanda Seyfried and premiered at the 2014 South by Southwest in March.  Smith also appeared in the HBO mini-series Olive Kitteridge and the film Carol. In 2018, he starred in his first leading role in the independent drama 1985.

Smith has also narrated an episode of The New York Times Modern Love Podcast, for which he read Kalle Oskari Mattila's essay about catfishing.

Gotham

He appears in Gotham as Edward Nygma. Of playing the character, Smith said in an interview: "What I'm really excited about is the bottom of that curve. Going from this quite innocent, well-intentioned, joyful person to starting to find this other part of him that he didn't know he had — accessing this place where he responds to the unfortunate things that people are doing to him, and starting to realize how cruel people are to him and how they mistreat him, and then doing that back to them. He's a person who's constantly abused, and to finally reach a part of himself where he just can't take it anymore and starts doing it to other people — and it's out of anger and exhaustion, and then realizing that when you start taking control of situations like that, you can gain power that way — it'll be something that he can start to enjoy." "[The Penguin] and I could not have more different trajectories," Smith tells Yahoo TV. Cobblepot is "a very sadistic bully" from the beginning. Ed, by contrast, is "way, way out in left field," just "hanging out, doing his job, loving his work, loving science, having a good time, getting a little weird, being a little off the wall, a little eccentric." He's not really a bad guy — in fact, he's really more of an overgrown boy. His journey, Smith says, will be to "claim his identity and claim his power and perhaps finally become someone that is a player in the field and not just this irritating, flimsy young lad."

Personal life
In a March 2018 interview, Smith stated that he is queer.

Acting credits

Film

Television

Theatre

Awards and nominations

References

External links

 
 

Living people
1986 births
21st-century American male actors
American male film actors
American male stage actors
American male television actors
LGBT male actors
Male actors from Columbus, Ohio
Otterbein University alumni
Queer actors
Queer men
LGBT people from Ohio
American LGBT actors
21st-century LGBT people